Democratic Front or the Maha Aghadi is name of the former governing coalition in the Indian state of Maharashtra. The Alliance of Indian National Congress and Nationalist Congress Party was called as Maha Aghadi.

Background 
The alliance was created post 1999 Maharashtra Assembly Poll results as Congress and NCP contested against each other without a pre-poll alliance but came together to stake claim to form the government. The alliance constituted the Indian National Congress and Nationalist Congress Party. The alliance won the Maharashtra Vidhan Sabha Elections of 1999,2004,2009 respectively.

Electoral Performance

References

Political parties in Maharashtra
Coalition governments of India
Defunct political party alliances in India
Political parties established in 1999
1999 establishments in Maharashtra
United Progressive Alliance